Darzab may refer to:

Darzab, Faryab, Afghanistan
Darzab, Jowzjan, Afghanistan
Darzab District, Afghanistan
Darzab, Iran, in Razavi Khorasan Province
Darzab, alternate name of Deraz Ab, in Razavi Khorasan Province
Darzab Rural District, in Razavi Khorasan Province